Actias arianeae is a moth in the family Saturniidae. It is found in China (Shaanxi).

References

arianeae
Moths described in 2007
Moths of Asia